Rete pegs (also known as rete processes or rete ridges) are the epithelial extensions that project into the underlying connective tissue in both skin and mucous membranes.

In the epithelium of the mouth, the attached gingiva exhibit rete pegs, while the sulcular and junctional epithelia do not. Scar tissue lacks rete pegs and scars tend to shear off more easily than normal tissue as a result.

Also known as papillae, they are downward thickenings of the epidermis between the dermal papillae.

References

Dermatology